La Panouse is a commune in the Lozère département in southern France.

Points of interest
Arboretum Curie

See also
Communes of the Lozère department

References

Panouse